Carole Massé (born 1949) is a Quebec writer.

She was born in Montreal and studied literature at the Université du Québec à Montréal. She has worked as an editor.

Selected works 
 Rejet, poetry (1975)
 Dieu, novel (1979)
 L'autre, poetry (1984)
 L'Existence, novel (1984), finalist for a Governor General's Award for French-language fiction
 Nobody, novel (1985)
 Je vous aime, poetry (1986)
 Hommes, novel (1987), finalist for the Grands Prix of the Journal de Montréal
 Los, poetry (1988)
 La mémoire dérobée, poetry (1997), received the 
 L'Ennemi, novel (1998), finalist for a Governor General's Literary Award
 Secrets et pardons, novel (2007)
 L'arrivée au monde, novel (2010)

References 

1949 births
Living people
Canadian novelists in French
Canadian poets in French
Canadian women novelists
Canadian women poets
20th-century Canadian novelists
20th-century Canadian poets
20th-century Canadian women writers
21st-century Canadian novelists
21st-century Canadian women writers
Writers from Montreal
Université du Québec à Montréal alumni